Piotr Bruzda (1946–1997) was an international speedway rider from Poland.

Speedway career 
Bruzda reached the final of the Speedway World Pairs Championship in the 1975 Speedway World Pairs Championship winning a silver medal.

World Final appearances

World Pairs Championship
 1975 -  Wrocław, Olympic Stadium (with Edward Jancarz) - 2nd - 23pts (15)

References 

1946 births
1997 deaths
Polish speedway riders
People from Środa Śląska